The 1986 Georgia Bulldogs football team represented the University of Georgia during the 1986 NCAA Division I-A football season.

Schedule

Roster

Season summary

at Auburn
"The Game Between the Hoses"

Wayne Johnson made the start in place of James Jackson, who missed the game to attend the funeral of his grandmother.

Georgia Tech

Hall of Fame Bowl (vs Boston College)

References

Georgia
Georgia Bulldogs football seasons
Georgia Bulldogs football